Laura Latini (November 3, 1969 – August 19, 2012) was an Italian voice actress.

Biography 
Latini was the first-born daughter of voice actor Franco Latini and dialogue writer Maria Pinto. She was also the sister of voice actress Ilaria Latini and the half-sister of voice actor Fabrizio Vidale. Latini was best known for providing the Italian dubbed voice of Karen Walker from Will & Grace, among other roles. She regularly dubbed actresses such as Katherine Heigl, Thora Birch, Chyler Leigh, Regina Hall, Jennifer Love Hewitt, Charlotte Gainsbourg and Hilary Swank.

In her animated roles, Latini voiced Dijonay Jones in the Italian dubbed version of The Proud Family, Pixie in Pixie and Dixie and Mr. Jinks, Blinky Bill in The Adventures of Blinky Bill, Sherri & Terri in The Simpsons, Gwen in Total Drama, Rita in Flushed Away and many more.

Death 
Latini died of cancer on 19 August 2012. She was 42 years old. At that point in time, several of her roles were replaced by other actresses, such as Roberta de Roberto, who took over her roles of Karen Walker in the 2017 revival of Will & Grace, and Gwen in Total Drama All-Stars.

Latini was buried at Campo Verano alongside her father.

Dubbing roles

Animation 
Pixie in Pixie and Dixie and Mr. Jinks
Blinky Bill in The Adventures of Blinky Bill
Skippy Squirrel in Animaniacs
 Fievel Mousekewitz in An American Tail: The Treasure of Manhattan Island
 Tessa in The Triplets
 Dijonay Jones in The Proud Family
 Dijonay Jones in The Proud Family Movie
 Sherri & Terri (1st voice), Ralph Wiggum (1st voice) in The Simpsons
 Linny in Wonder Pets
 Rita Malone in Flushed Away
 Fizz in Tweenies
 Shovel in Blue's Clues
 Adam Lyon in My Gym Partner's a Monkey
 Millie Burtonburger in Kid vs. Kat
 Huey & Riley Freeman in The Boondocks
 Austin in The Backyardigans
 Gwen (1st voice) in Total Drama
 Sleeping Beauty in Shrek the Third
 Veemon in Digimon: The Movie
 Angel in Lilo & Stitch: The Series

Live action 
 Karen Walker in Will & Grace (season 1–8)
 Isabel Evans in Roswell
 Lexie Grey in Grey's Anatomy
 Brenda Meeks in Scary Movie
 Brenda Meeks in Scary Movie 2
 Brenda Meeks in Scary Movie 3
 Brenda Meeks in Scary Movie 4
 Daisy Duke in The Dukes of Hazzard
 Kim Bauer in 24
 Margaret in Sister Act 2: Back in the Habit
 Buzzy in 11:14
 Jade in The Hangover
 Nadine in Stan Helsing
 Jen Barber in The IT Crowd
 Anya Jenkins in Buffy the Vampire Slayer
 Chloe in American Pie Presents: Band Camp
 Claire Fisher in Six Feet Under
 Page Conners in Heartbreakers
 Morley Clarkson in Valentine's Day
 Nicole Maris in Drive Me Crazy
 Janey in In the Land of Women
 Samantha Baker in Sixteen Candles

References

External links 
 
 

1969 births
2012 deaths
Actresses from Rome
Italian voice actresses
20th-century Italian actresses
21st-century Italian actresses
Deaths from cancer in Lazio
Burials at Campo Verano